Shakhzoda Ibragimova (born 24 November 2002) is an Uzbek rhythmic gymnast, member of the national group.

Career 
In 2022 Shakhzoda entered the senior national group, debuting at the World Cup in Tashkent, winning silver in the All-Around and with 5 hoops as well as gold with 3 ribbons and 2 balls. A week later the group competed in Baku, ending 6th in the All-Around, 7th with 5 hoops and 3 ribbons and 2 balls. In June she took part in the World Cup in Pesaro, taking 8th place in the All-Around and 7th with 5 hoops. She was then selected for the Asian Championships in Pattaya, winning gold in teams, the All-Around and with 3 ribbons and 2 balls and silver with 5 hoops. In August Khurshidabonu competed at the 2021 Islamic Solidarity Games in Konya where the group won silver in the All-Around and with 3 ribbons and 2 balls, gold with 5 hoops. 

In September Abduraufova took part in the World Championships in Sofia along Nilufar Azamova, Nargiza Djumaniyazova, Khurshidabonu Abduraufova, Mumtozabonu Iskhokzoda, Mariya Pak, and the two individuals Takhmina Ikromova and Yosmina Rakhimova, taking 18th place in the All-Around, 13th with 5 hoops and 20th with 3 ribbons + 2 balls.

References 

Living people
2002 births
Uzbekistani rhythmic gymnasts